Loigny-la-Bataille is a commune in the Eure-et-Loir department in northern France.

History
The commune was the site of a major battle Battle of Loigny-Poupry on Friday, December 2, 1870  during the Franco-Prussian War when a French force of about 300 soldiers under General Gaston De Sonis fought a Prussian force of almost 2000. The battle is commemorated by several monuments including a memorial chapel dedicated to the Sacred Heart.

Population

See also
Communes of the Eure-et-Loir department

References

Communes of Eure-et-Loir